Josias von Heeringen (9 March 1850 – 9 October 1926) was a German general of the imperial era who served as Prussian Minister of War and saw service in the First World War.

Early life
Heeringen was born in Kassel in the Electorate of Hesse. He was the son of Josias von Heeringen (1809–1885) and his wife Karoline von Starkloff (1817–1871). His younger brother August von Heeringen (* 26. November 1855 in Kassel; † 29. September 1927 in Berlin), served as a naval officer and was a Chief of the German Imperial Admiralty Staff. Josias von Heeringen married in 1874 Augusta von Dewall.

Career
After having served on various posts, in 1887 he became a major in the Prussian Ministry of War. From 1892 to 1895, he was a department head on the German General Staff. In 1898 he was appointed a Major-General and chosen to head the Army Administration Department of the Ministry of War.

In 1901 he was made a Generalleutnant and in 1903 became head of the 22nd Division. In 1906 he was made a General der Infanterie, and also commander of the II Army Corps, whose headquarters was in Stettin. From 1909 to 1913, he was Prussian Minister of War. Just like his predecessors, Heinrich von Gossler and Karl von Einem, von Heeringen thought that the army should not be expanded too quickly as wished by the General Staff. Instead he emphasized reformist efforts, placed more on the technical perfection of the army and the quality of the training. Heeringen stopped the immediate formation of three new army corps, delaying them to be planned for 1916 to 1921. This drew the ire of Chief of Staff Helmuth von Moltke and other officers like department chief Erich Ludendorff. Heeringen asked to be released from his post in 1913. Afterwards he became Inspector-General of the II Army Inspectorate, headquartered in Berlin.

When World War I began in August 1914 he was made commander of the Seventh Army, the army that was being used as a decoy for the attempted German invasion of France. He successfully defended Alsace against the French in the Battle of Mulhouse, for which he was awarded the Pour le Mérite on 28 August 1915. He´d receive the oak leaves one year later. In 1914 he had also received the Freedom of the City of Kassel. He commanded the Seventh Army until 1916, when he was transferred to command the German Coastal Defence for the rest of the war. He left active service with the rank of a Colonel General.

Later life
From 1918 to 1926, he was president of the Kyffhäuserbund. He died on 9 October 1926 in Berlin-Charlottenburg.

Honours and awards

References

External links
 

1850 births
1926 deaths
German untitled nobility
German military personnel of the Franco-Prussian War
German Army generals of World War I
Military personnel from Kassel
People from the Electorate of Hesse
Colonel generals of Prussia
Prussian politicians
Burials at the Invalids' Cemetery
19th-century Prussian military personnel
Recipients of the Iron Cross (1870), 2nd class
Recipients of the Pour le Mérite (military class)
Grand Crosses of the Military Merit Order (Bavaria)
Grand Crosses of the Order of Saint Stephen of Hungary
Grand Cordons of the Order of the Rising Sun
Recipients of the Order of the Sacred Treasure, 2nd class